18-Hydroxy-11-deoxycorticosterone (also known as 18-OH-DOC, 18,21-dihydroxyprogesterone, and 18,21-dihydroxypregn-4-ene-3,20-dione) is an endogenous steroid and a mineralocorticoid. It is a hydroxylated metabolite of 11-deoxycorticosterone.

In rats, conversion of 11-deoxycorticosterone into 18-OH-DOC is catalyzed by the CYP11B3 enzyme.

In humans, 18-OH-DOC is a weak mineralocorticoid. It may be increased in 17α-hydroxylase (CYP17A1) deficiency, in aldosterone synthase (CYP11B2) deficiency, in primary aldosteronism, and may also indicate a histologic variant of the aldosteronoma. Excessive secretion of 18-OH-DOC can cause mineralocorticoid excess syndrome, although these cases are very rare.

References

External links 
 

Mineralocorticoids
Steroid hormones